France Boisvert (born June 10, 1959) is a Quebec educator and writer.

Life
She was born in Sherbrooke, Quebec and received a bachelor's and master's degree in French studies at the Université de Sherbrooke and a PhD from the Université de Montréal. She taught literature at the Collège Lionel-Groulx in Sainte-Thérèse. She was a member of Union des écrivaines et des écrivains québécois (UNEQ) and served on its board of directors.

Boisvert helped launch the literary radio program Au pays des Livres and served as its host. Her poems and essays appeared in various literary journals, such as NBJ, Moebius, Arcade, Liberté, Ruptures - La revue des Trois Amériques, Revue Trois, Littéréalité and La Vie en Rose. From September 2012 to September 2016, she get a radio show named Le Pays des Livres on Radio VM at Montreal.

Selected works 
 Les Samourailles, novel (1987)
 Li Tsing-Tao - ou Le grand avoir, short stories (1989)
 Massawippi, poetry (1992)
 Comme un vol de gerfauts, poetry (1993)
 Les vents de l'aube, poetry (1997)
 Le Voyageur aux yeux d'onyx, poetry (2003)
 Un vernis de culture, short stories (2012)
 Vies parallèles, short stories (2014)
 Vers Compostelle, poetry (2014)
 Professeur de paragraphe, novel (2017)

References 

1959 births
Living people
Canadian poets in French
Canadian novelists in French
Canadian short story writers in French
Canadian women novelists
Canadian women poets
Canadian women short story writers
20th-century Canadian novelists
20th-century Canadian poets
21st-century Canadian poets
Writers from Sherbrooke
Université de Sherbrooke alumni
Université de Montréal alumni
20th-century Canadian women writers
20th-century Canadian short story writers
21st-century Canadian short story writers
21st-century Canadian women writers
20th-century Canadian essayists
21st-century Canadian essayists
Canadian women essayists